Grigoriy Shtein (born 6 March 1996 in Astana) is a Kazakh cyclist, who currently rides for UCI Continental team .

Major results
2014
 1st Road race, Asian Junior Road Championships
 1st  Road race, National Junior Road Championships
2016
 2nd Gran Premio della Liberazione
2017
 1st Stage 6 Bałtyk–Karkonosze Tour
 3rd Road race, National Road Championships
 9th Overall CCC Tour – Grody Piastowskie

References

External links

1996 births
Living people
Kazakhstani male cyclists
20th-century Kazakhstani people
21st-century Kazakhstani people